Ivan Močinić (born 30 April 1993) is a Croatian retired football midfielder who last played for Croatian First Football League side Šibenik.

Club career

Rijeka
Močinić made his début for Rijeka in an away match against Dinamo Zagreb in October 2011. During his first professional season he collected 13 caps. Močinić scored his first goal for Rijeka in the last round of 2011–12 Prva HNL, against Karlovac 1919. During the following five seasons with Rijeka, he has been a regular starter on most occasions, collecting 141 appearances in the league, domestic cup and Europe. Močinić performed most consistently during the 2013–14 season when his solid performances earned him 47 appearances in all competitions. He particularly impressed in Rijeka's triumph over Dinamo Zagreb in the 2014 Croatian Football Cup Final. Močinić was team captain for the first time in the away loss to Dinamo Zagreb on 12 April 2014. During the 2015–16 season, he had more starts as the team captain than any other teammate.

During the 2015 winter transfer window, numerous clubs expressed interest in signing Močinić, namely Dinamo Zagreb, Newcastle United, Celtic, Rubin Kazan, Lazio, Sampdoria, Atalanta, Carpi, Bordeaux and Olympiacos. However, Rijeka rejected several offers and Močinić stayed with the club.

Rapid Wien
On 16 July 2016, both the Austrian and Croatian press reported that Močinić agreed terms with SK Rapid Wien, with the transfer valued at €2.5 million.

International career
Močinić earned 21 caps for Croatia's under-19, under-20 and under-21 sides, including three caps at the 2012 UEFA European Under-19 Football Championship. His impressive performances in the first half of 2014 earned him a first call-up for the Croatia national football team. He was originally included in the 2014 FIFA World Cup squad for Croatia, but a last minute injury forced him out of the tournament. On 17 November 2015, Močinić made a senior national team début for Croatia in an away win against Russia, when he played the entire match. It was his sole international appearance.

Career statistics

Honours

Club
Rijeka
Croatian Cup: 2013–14
Croatian Super Cup: 2014

Individual
Football Oscar Team of the Year: 2014

References

External links
 

 

1993 births
Living people
Footballers from Rijeka
Association football midfielders
Croatian footballers
Croatia youth international footballers
Croatia under-21 international footballers
Croatia international footballers
HNK Rijeka players
HNK Rijeka II players
SK Rapid Wien players
NK Istra 1961 players
NK Olimpija Ljubljana (2005) players
HNK Šibenik players
Croatian Football League players
Austrian Football Bundesliga players
Slovenian PrvaLiga players
Croatian expatriate footballers
Expatriate footballers in Austria
Expatriate footballers in Slovenia
Croatian expatriate sportspeople in Austria
Croatian expatriate sportspeople in Slovenia